The EMD G22 Locomotive Series made their debut in 1967 after the rise in popularity of the export EMD G12. Designed to meet most First World, Second World and Third World country requirements, the G22 Series was equipped with a naturally aspirated EMD 645 Series engine as well as four axle Flexicoil Type-B trucks which carried a low per-axle weight. Based on customer input, the G22 Series was defined by various designations that suited the customer's railway operations.

The standard suffixes applied after the G22 designation were if the customer purchased locomotives with specific traction motors to fit Narrow Gauge (U) or Broad Gauge (W) rails. As the years progressed, the customers began to have more options available for their locomotives including EMD Dash 2 electronics, alternators instead of generators, A-1-A running gear and/or steam generators.

The G22 designation could be freely applied to the designs of any EMD export model or a licensee of EMD as long as the electrical and mechanical gear were left unaltered.

Overview 
With the introduction of the 645 engine in export models in 1967, the model numbers changed by adding "10". Thus the G12 became the G22. This new model was an upgrade from the 567 series G12 and brought forward various innovations for almost four decades. To this day, the G22 series is the most common diesel found in Brazil, New Zealand and in Egypt.

The G22 Series was one of the first models to be commonly constructed outside of the United States and to have its own separate designation based on traction motors/gauge, generator, etc. Unlike the G12, where its six axle version was the GR12, the six axle version of the G22 Series was designated as G22C. The customer then had options to apply on the locomotive as desired.

Several models were introduced:

G22W
G22U
G22W-AC
G22W-2

G22W
The G22W first appeared in 1967. To differentiate itself from its predecessor, the G22W was identified by a W suffix to indicate that this model was supplied with traction motors adjustable only for Wide gauged rails (Standard gauge up to  broad gauge).

The G22W model found success among several buyers and were also built in different countries to suit the customers' needs. One notable difference in the car body design came with the order of Swedish G22Ws. Completely redesigned to meet the Scandinavian weather conditions, these units resembled a G22W only by their internal electrical and mechanical equipment. These were designated SJ T44.

Production lasted from 1967 to 1989.

G22U
The G22U appeared alongside its wide gauge counterpart in 1969. To separate itself from its predecessor G12 as well as the G22W, the G22U was identified by a U suffix to indicate that this model was supplied with traction motors adjustable to any rail gauge Universally (Metre Gauge up to Irish Gauge).

The G22U model found success among several buyers and were also built in different countries to suit the customers needs. The Yugoslav locomotives were equipped with a steam generator located in the high short hood. Both the Yugoslav Railways and Taiwan Railroad Administration purchased their G22Us with a unique A-1-A running gear configuration. This did not alter the models designation as the centre axles were not powered nor were A-1-A trucks widely produced at the time.

This locomotive found itself to be very successful in the metre gauge lines of Brazil, as most lines did not permit the use of six-axle locomotives around tight curves.

Production spanned from 1969 to 1974.

G22W-AC
The G22W-AC first appeared in 1980. Compared to the base model G22, the G22W-AC added an AC suffix to indicate the use of EMD AR6 alternator generating Alternating Current, improving reliability compared to the previous DC generator.  Output from the alternator was then rectified back to Direct Current for the traction motors.  The G22W-AC came equipped with 4x EMD D77 traction motors, which were designed for Wide gauged rails (Standard Gauge up to Irish Gauge).

Production spanned from 1980 to 1991.

G22W-2
The G22W-2 first appeared in 1991. Compared to the base model G22, the G22W-2 was identified by a -2 suffix to indicate the use of Dash-2 modular electronics (which included the use of the AC alternator used on the G22W-AC).  The traction motors were adjustable for Wide gauged rails (Standard Gauge up to Irish Gauge).  The updated electronics improved availability, efficiency and ease of maintenance of the locomotive.

Phasing
Only two general variations have been noticed during the G22 production, most notably on the constant production of the RFFSA G22Us.

 Phase 1: Larger frame sill, air reservoir slung under skirting.
 Phase 2: Smaller frame sill, air reservoir exposed, and two horizontal bars along intake grilles.

There have been various as-modifications on railroads as well, but are excluded due to various degrees of completion on the modification.

Models
The G22U/G22W model is represented in HO Scale by Frateschi trains of Brazil. Due to the accommodation of the motor, the model is not entirely accurate.

See also 

Astarsa
Brazilian Miracle
EMD G22CU
List of GMD Locomotives
List of GM-EMD locomotives
RFFSA

External links 
Electro-Motive Division Export GM Models
Astilleros Argentinos Rio de la Plata S.A. GM Export Models
Material Y Construcciones S.A. GM Export Models
Nydqvist Och Holm Aktiebolag GM Export Models
Đuro Đaković GM Export Models
General Motors Diesel Division Export Models
Frateschi G22U HO Scale Model
GM G22U Data Sheet 
:pt:EMD G22U EMD G22U Article in Portuguese.

B-B locomotives
Export locomotives
Diesel-electric locomotives of Brazil
Diesel-electric locomotives of Egypt
Diesel-electric locomotives of Guinea
Diesel-electric locomotives of Iran
Diesel-electric locomotives of Israel
Diesel-electric locomotives of Sweden
Diesel-electric locomotives of Taiwan
Diesel-electric locomotives of Yugoslavia
Railway locomotives introduced in 1968
G22
Diesel-electric locomotives of Montenegro
Metre gauge diesel locomotives
3 ft 6 in gauge locomotives
Standard gauge locomotives of South Korea
Standard gauge locomotives of Egypt
Standard gauge locomotives of Iran
Standard gauge locomotives of Israel
Standard gauge locomotives of Sweden